Mühlau is a municipality in the district of Mittelsachsen, in Saxony, Germany. Mühlau lies in the arch mountain foothills approximately 3 kilometers to the north of Limbach-Oberfrohna, and 15 kilometers northwest of Chemnitz. The settlers of Mühlau originally came from Mehlem (currently part of  Bonn) on the Rhine. The local name Mühlau is derived from the former home town.

References 

Mittelsachsen